Chance is Manfred Mann's Earth Band's tenth album, released in 1980. The album cover art was an adaptation of Danish artist Ole Kortzau's poster "Strandstole" (deck chairs). The album marked the temporary return of guitarist and founding member Mick Rogers to the band. John Lingwood replaced drummer Geoff Britton, who left due to illness. It is also the last album that bassist Pat King appeared on. Although Chris Thompson only appeared as a guest vocalist (having officially left the band after Angel Station), he was onboard again for the accompanying tour.

Track listing

Side one
"Lies (Through the 80s)" (Denny Newman) – 4:37
"On the Run" (Manfred Mann, Tony Ashton, Florrie Palmer) – 3:53
"For You" (Bruce Springsteen) – 5:41
"Adolescent Dream" (Mann) – 2:42
"Fritz the Blank" (Mann) – 2:52

Side two
"Stranded" (Mike Heron, Mann) – 5:49
"Hello, I Am Your Heart" (Dennis Linde) – 5:19
"No Guarantee" (Mann) – 3:50
"Heart on the Street" (Tom Gray) – 4:56

Bonus Tracks (1999 CD re-issue)
 "A Fool I Am" (single B side) (Mann, Pat King, John Lingwood, Steve Waller) – 4:16
"Adolescent Dream" (single version) (Mann) – 2:24
"Lies (Through the 80s)" (single version) (Newman) – 4:15
"For You" (single version) (Springsteen) – 3:53

Personnel

The Earth Band
 Manfred Mann – keyboards, vocals ("Adolescent Dream")
 John Lingwood – drums
 Pat King – bass, bass pedals
 Mick Rogers – guitars
 Steve Waller – guitars, vocals ("Hello, I Am Your Heart")
 Chris Thompson – vocals ("Lies Through The 80s", "On The Run", "For You"; co-lead vocals on "Stranded")

Additional musicians
 Trevor Rabin – guitars
 Robbie McIntosh – guitars
 Geoff Whitehorn – guitars
 Barbara Thompson – saxophone ("On the Run")
 Dyan Birch – vocals ("No Guarantee" and others)
 Willy Finlayson – vocals ("Heart On The Street")
 Peter Marsh – vocals ("Stranded")
 Carol Stocker – backing vocals

Technical
 Manfred Mann – producer
 Trevor Rabin – producer
 Bernie Clarke – co-producer (Portugal)
 Rik Walton – engineer
 David Barratt, Edwin Cross, Laurie Latham, Robert Stewart – assistant engineers
 Peter Schwier, Tim Summerhayes – assistant engineers (Portugal)
 Martin Poole – design
 Ole Kortzau – cover art

Charts

Weekly charts

Year-end charts

References

External links

Manfred Mann's Earth Band albums
1980 albums
Albums produced by Trevor Rabin
Bronze Records albums
Warner Records albums